This article is a list of spokespeople of the Government of France since the office was established in 1969.

List
 20 June 1969 – 15 May 1972: Léo Hamon
 15 May 1972 – 5 April 1973: Jean-Philippe Lecat
 28 May 1974 – 25 August 1976: André Rossi
 23 March 1983 – 18 June 1984: Max Gallo
 18 June 1984 – 7 December 1984: Roland Dumas
 7 December 1984 – 20 March 1986: Georgina Dufoix
 20 March 1986 – 10 May 1988: Alain Juppé
 23 June 1988 – 15 May 1991: Louis Le Pensec et Claude Evin
 15 May 1991 – 31 March 1992: Jack Lang
 2 April 1992 – 2 October 1992: Martin Malvy
 2 October 1992 – 28 March 1993: Louis Mermaz
 29 March 1993 – 19 January 1995: Nicolas Sarkozy
 19 January 1995 – 16 May 1995: Philippe Douste-Blazy
 17 May 1995 – 7 November 1995: François Baroin
 7 November 1995 – 2 June 1997: Alain Lamassoure
 4 June 1997 – 30 April 2002: Catherine Trautmann
 6 May 2002 – 15 May 2007: Jean-François Copé
 18 May 2007 – 18 June 2007: Christine Albanel
 19 June 2007 –  18 March 2008: Laurent Wauquiez
 18 March 2008 – 13 November 2010: Luc Chatel
 14 November 2010 - 19 July 2011: François Baroin
 19 July 2011 - 10 May 2012: Valérie Pécresse
 16 May 2012 – 15 August 2014: Najat Vallaud-Belkacem
 15 August 2014 – 10 May 2017: Stéphane Le Foll
 17 May 2017 – 24 November 2017: Christophe Castaner
 24 November 2017 – 27 March 2019: Benjamin Griveaux
 1 April 2019 – 6 July 2020: Sibeth Ndiaye
 6 July 2020 - 20 May 2022: Gabriel Attal
 20 May 2022 - 4 July 2022: Olivia Grégoire
 Since 4 July 2022: Olivier Véran

Spokespeople
Spokespeople